Cagayan Valley, is an administrative region in the Philippines, located in the northeastern section of Luzon Island. It is composed of five Philippine provinces: Batanes, Cagayan, Isabela, Nueva Vizcaya, and Quirino. The region hosts four chartered cities of Cauayan, Ilagan, Santiago, and Tuguegarao.

Most of the land area is situated on the valley between the Cordilleras and the Sierra Madre mountain ranges. The eponymous Cagayan River, the country's largest and longest, runs through the region and flows from the Caraballo Mountains and ends at Aparri. Cagayan Valley is the second largest Philippine administrative region by land area. According to a literacy survey in 2013, 97.2% of Cagayan Valley's citizens (ages 10 to 64) are functionally literate, which is the highest out of the seventeen regions of the Philippines.

History 

Archaeology indicates that Cagayan has been inhabited for half a million years, though no human remains of any such antiquity have yet appeared. The earliest inhabitants are the Agta, or Atta, food-gatherers who roam the forests without fixed abodes. A large tract of land has lately been returned to them. The bulk of the population are of Austronesian origin. For centuries before the coming of the Spanish, the inhabitants traded with Indians, Malays, Chinese, and Japanese. In the nineteenth and 20th centuries, the prosperity found in tobacco cultivation caused many Ilokano people to settle here, it was only in this large-scale Ilocano settlement that made Ilocano language replace Ibanag as the lingua franca of the region. Tobacco is still a major factor in the economy of Cagayan, though a special economic zone and free port has been created to strengthen and diversify the provincial economy.

During the Spanish era, Cagayan Valley had a larger territory than today, then named Provincia de Cagayan. Then it included the territories of the above-mentioned provinces and the eastern parts of the Cordillera provinces of Apayao, Kalinga, Ifugao and Benguet, and the north part of Aurora. Historian and missionary Jose Burgues said, "The old Cagayan Valley comprises the province of Cagayan, Isabela and Nueva Vizcaya as well as the military Districts of Apayao, Itaves, Quiangan, Cayapa and Bintangan, plus the area of the Sierra Madre to the Pacific Ocean in the said trajectory."

During World War II, at Balete Pass in Nueva Vizcaya, the retreating Japanese Imperial Army under General Tomoyuki Yamashita dug in and held on for three months against the American and Filipino forces who eventually drove them out; the pass is now called Dalton Pass in honor of General Dalton, USA, who was killed in the fighting.

Geography

Cagayan Valley is the large mass of land in the northeastern region of Luzon, comprising the provinces of Cagayan, Isabela, Nueva Vizcaya, Quirino, and the Batanes group of islands. It is bordered to the west by the Cordillera mountain range, to the east by the Sierra Madre, to the south by the Caraballo Mountains, and to the north by the Luzon Strait.

The region contains two landlocked provinces, Quirino and Nueva Vizcaya, which are ruggedly mountainous and heavily forested. Nueva Vizcaya is the remnant of the southern province created when Cagayan Province was divided in two in 1839. They are ethnically and linguistically diverse, with a substrate of Agtas, Negritos who are food-gatherers with no fixed abodes, overlaid by Ilongots and others in a number of tribes, some of whom were fierce head-hunters (they have given up the practice), with the latest but largest element of the population being the Ilocanos, closely followed by the Ibanags.

Administrative divisions
Cagayan Valley comprises five provinces, one independent city, three component cities, 89 municipalities, and 2,311 barangays.

Provinces

Governors and vice governors

Cities and Municipalities

Demographics

Economy

The province of Isabela and the city of Santiago are notably the most progressive province and richest city in the region, respectively. Isabela was the 9th richest province in the Philippines in 2021, being the only province from the region to be included in the list.

The city of Tuguegarao is the center of excellence in education, commerce, trade and culture and as the economic center of the region, the city continuously aims for outstanding performance and competence in administration, citizen participation, community and economic development, cultural arts, education, fiscal management, infrastructure, intergovernmental cooperation, planning, public safety, recreation and leisure services, social services, and technology. Its economy gradually shifted from agriculture to secondary/tertiary economic activities such as trading, commerce and services. The shift was ushered by city's role as the Regional Government Center and Center of Commerce in Northern Luzon.

Tuguegarao City was included to be one of the digital cities for 2025 to sustain the rapid growth of the Information Technology and Business Process Management and to promote development in the city. The program (Digital Cities 2025) was created through a partnership between the DICT, the IT and Business Process Association of the Philippines (IBPAP), and Leechiu Property Consultants (LPC).

Cauayan is a component city in the province of Isabela. It is dubbed as the Ideal City of the North and the host city for the proposed Isabela Special Economic Zone and the Regional Agro-Industrial Growth Center. It is the home of Cosmos Bottling Corporation, now acquired by the giant multinational business conglomerate San Miguel Corporation manufactures soft drinks in the area and the Mega Asia Bottling Corporation with its newly built plant for RC Cola brand. It is also here where the regional sales offices of several multi-national companies are located. As a young city, it has enormous potential for small to large enterprises and its real estate industry is just beginning. Medium size commercial centers or subdivisions are the appropriate ventures to put up.

Ilagan is a component city and the capital of the province of Isabela. The city is the Corn Capital of the Philippines and has been considered as the Primary Growth Center of Region 2. Most of the industries in the city are agri-based. Over the past decades, there has been a great number of local investments in poultry and hog raising. There are several poultry contract growers and small and medium scale hog raisers in the city. Other support facilities, warehouses and small and big rice mills, strategically located in the different barangays of the city to address the storage needs of farmers during the harvest season. Of all cities in the country, Ilagan ranks as the top producer of corn. As an agriculture-based city, it produces ample supply of corn, rice, vegetables and legumes. Fruits like the banana are year-round products especially in the mountainous areas of the city. Ilagan also produces seasonal fruits such as mangoes and pomelo. Commerce and trade is considered to be the city's second economic-based income. It is also the hub of the Coca-Cola FEMSA Philippines, Inc., one of the industrial complexes in the region.

Solano is a first class municipality and the main commercial and financial center of the province of Nueva Vizcaya. It also has the most fast food restaurants chains and the most banks among the municipalities in the entire region. According to the 2016 Cities and Municipalities Competitiveness Index conducted by the National Competitiveness Council, Solano took the 25th spot overall and ranked 30th among the first class and second class municipalities in the Philippines. This further solidified the status of Solano as the undisputed premier town of Cagayan Valley being the premier town in Nueva Vizcaya and the fastest-growing municipality in the region.

Cagayan has several attractions which include beaches, swimming, snorkeling, skin-diving, fishing in the river and the sea, hiking in primeval forest, mountain-climbing, archaeological sites, the collection of the provincial museum, the Callao Caves, and many churches. 
The Cagayan Economic Zone Authority (CEZA) is situated in Santa Ana, Cagayan.

Quirino is the youngest province in the region. With its agricultural based nature, the vast vegetative agricultural covers reveal the major source of living of the people. Farming has been the main industry in the province, with rice and corn as major crops as with other provinces in the region. Virgin forest and wealthy bodies of water have been great contributors in its development. Small scale industries like furniture making, basketry, rattan craft, and dried/fossilized flower production, where the province was famously known, are prevalent. Banana products also sold in and out the province and also for export purposes. The small scale business and associations also make their own products like banana chips, peanuts, patupats and others. The province also produces a substantial amount of fruits/crops like mango, citrus, pineapple, coffee, coconut, papaya, lanzones, rambutan and vegetables.

The province of Nueva Vizcaya has basically an agricultural economy with commerce, trade, and industry contributing to its growth and development. Among other major economic activities are farming and cattle and swine raising. Primary crops are palay and corn. The province produces quality onions and vegetables often sold in Metro Manila. Oranges and mangoes are now major crops being exported fresh to other Asian countries; earning its title as the Citrus Capital of the Philippines.

Batanes is the northernmost and smallest province in the region as well as in the whole Philippines. It is the only province located outside the mainland Cagayan Valley. Due to its geographical location, fishing is considered as a major industry and source of livelihood for the people. Garlic and cattle are major export crops. Ivatans also plant camote (sweet potato), cassava, gabi or tuber and a unique variety of white uvi. Sugarcane is raised to produce palek, a kind of native wine, and vinegar. Tourism also contributes to the province's thriving economy.

Trade and industry
In 2014, retail giants like Robinsons Land and SM Prime opened its pioneer malls in the region, the Robinsons Place Santiago and SM City Cauayan in Santiago City and Cauayan respectively. The two retail companies further strengthened their presence in the region with the opening of SM Center Tuguegarao Downtown in 2017 and Robinsons Place Tuguegarao in 2018, both are located in the region's capital, Tuguegarao City. In 2022, SM Prime opened SM City Tuguegarao, its third in the region and second in Tuguegarao City.

In 2018, Vista Land and Life Scapes, Inc. announced the establishment of its first high-end mall in the region that is Vista Mall Santiago in Santiago City, and they are also putting up Vista Mall in Tuguegarao City it will be second on the region after Vista Mall Santiago.

Tilapia industry
On January 11, 2008, the Bureau of Fisheries and Aquatic Resources (BFAR) stated that tilapia (species of cichlid fishes from the tilapiine cichlid tribe) production grew and Cagayan Valley is now the Philippines' tilapia capital (Saint Peter's fish). Production supply grew 37.25% since 2003, with 14,000 metric tons (MT) in 2007. The recent aquaculture congress found that the growth of tilapia production was due to government interventions: provision of fast-growing species, accreditation of private hatcheries to ensure supply of quality fingerlings, establishment of demonstration farms, providing free fingerlings to newly constructed fishponds, and the dissemination of tilapia to Nueva Vizcaya (in Diadi town). Nueva Vizcaya Governor Luisa Lloren Cuaresma entered into similar aquaculture endeavors in addition to tilapia production. Isabela province is the richest in harvest among the other provinces in Region 2.

Citrus industry

Cagayan Valley is positioned to become the country's Citrus Capital through a program undertaken by the Nueva Vizcaya State University (NVSU) with funding from the Philippine Council for Agriculture, Aquatic and Natural Resources Research and Development of the Department of Science and Technology (DoST-PCAARRD). The country's domestic supply of citrus is currently insufficient to meet local demand, according to DoST-PCAARRD, due to "high incidence of pest and diseases, poor orchard management, and low adoption of improved management practices, among many other factors." The NVSU's citrus research and development program includes yield improvement, setting up a gene bank, and value chain analysis. It targets a 233% increase in yield — from 4.5 tons per hectare ha (t/ha) to 15 t/ha — and a 60% reduction in post-harvest losses from 25% to 10% by 2019. The targets are part of the Citrus Industry Strategic S&T Program (ISP) of DoST-PCAARRD. By the end of 2017, the program team is expected to produce value chain maps for calamansi, orange, and pomelo in the region; characterize fifteen species for the database system of the gene bank study; improve NVSU and Municipal Agriculture Office (MAGRO) citrus nurseries producing 10,000 and 2,000 budded seedlings, respectively; establish new 1-hectare orchard with planting materials from NVSU; and generate data on the description of local citrus pests and diseases.

Infrastructure

Roads and Bridges
 Pigalo Bridge - The Pigalo Bridge traverses over the Cagayan River in Angadanan, Isabela. This bridge also connects the two municipalities of Angadanan, Northeast Isabela and San Guillermo, Isabela at Southwest. The proposed construction of the Pigolo Bridge approaches the span of about 450 lin. meters across the Cagayan River, the project started on April 10, 2017, and was completed on April 29, 2019.
 Buntun Bridge - Buntun Bridge took three administrations to finish the construction from 1960 to 1969 connecting the municipality of Solana and Tuguegarao City. considered to be one of the longest bridge in the country crossing the longest river in the country called Cagayan River also known as the Rio Grande de Cagayan. The bridge was stretched to 1,369 m (meters) in length.

Image gallery

See also
List of Cultural Properties of the Philippines in Cagayan Valley

References

External links 
 
 
 

 
Regions of the Philippines
Luzon
Valleys of the Philippines